"Midlife Crisis" is a song by American rock band Faith No More. It was released on May 25, 1992, as the first single from their fourth album, Angel Dust. It became their only number-one hit on the US Billboard Modern Rock Tracks chart and reached number 10 on the UK Singles Chart.

Music and lyrics
"Midlife Crisis" is an alternative metal song, which incorporates progressive rock and hip hop elements.

Mike Patton has denied that the song is about having a midlife crisis, as he did not know what one would feel like, but says that "it's more about creating false emotion, being emotional, dwelling on your emotions and in a sense inventing them" and that:

Production
During production, the song was given the working title of "Madonna"; this title was later maintained as a set list name during live performances. The drum track for the song contains a sample of the first bar of the song "Cecilia", as performed by Simon and Garfunkel, repeated throughout. The bridge features a sample of "Car Thief" by the Beastie Boys.

Music video
The video for this song was directed by Kevin Kerslake, who also directed their shoestring video for the song "Everything's Ruined". The version on the Who Cares a Lot?: The Greatest Videos collection is uncensored and contains shots during the bridge which show a man being stretched by four horses (alluding to an old punishment for regicide, known as "quartering") – the censored version uses additional shots of choirboys running to a large cross instead. Singer Mike Patton can also be seen dancing around holding a spade.

For the video, the sound mix of this song is slightly different than the album version (on certain promotional releases it is referred to as 'The Scream Mix'). For the DVD re-release of Who Cares a Lot?: The Greatest Videos, the album version of the song is used instead, with the accommodating edits made.

Appearances and covers
"Midlife Crisis" has featured on the soundtrack for the videogames Tony Hawk's Underground 2 and Grand Theft Auto: San Andreas on the fictional radio station Radio X. It is a master track song on Rock Band 3, with the fade-out ending edited for gameplay reasons.

The song has been covered on industrial metal band Bile's 2002 album The Copy Machine. 

It was covered by American rock band Disturbed twice: the first time for a Faith No More tribute album, which was instead released through the Internet; the second time as a B-side to their fourth studio album Indestructible. This re-recorded version was released on Covered, A Revolution in Sound and remastered for a third release on their B-side compilation album The Lost Children. 

In 2021, ex-Korn drummer David Silveria's band Breaking in a Sequence included a cover of "Midlife Crisis" on their debut EP.

Track listings

Personnel
 Mike Patton – vocals, samples
 Billy Gould – bass guitar
 Jim Martin – guitar
 Roddy Bottum – keyboards
 Mike Bordin – drums

Charts

See also
 Number-one modern rock hits of 1992

References

External links
 AllMusic [ cassette single page]
 AllMusic  [ CD single page]

1992 singles
Faith No More songs
Songs written by Billy Gould
Songs written by Roddy Bottum
Songs written by Mike Patton
Songs written by Jim Martin (musician)
Songs written by Mike Bordin
1992 songs
Slash Records singles
Midlife crisis in fiction
Music videos directed by Kevin Kerslake